Knick may refer to:

Knickerbocker Hospital, aka The Knick, a defunct hospital of New York City
 New York Knicks (NBA basketball team), a Knick is a player for the Knicks
 Westchester Knicks (G-League basketball team), a Knick is a player for the Knicks
 The Knick (U.S. TV series), television medical drama
 Knick v. Township of Scott, Pennsylvania, 2019 U.S. Supreme Court decision on compensation for state/local taking of private property.

See also

 Knickerbocker (disambiguation)
 Knick Knack (disambiguation)
 
 Nick (disambiguation)
 NIC (disambiguation)
 Nik (disambiguation)
 'Nique (disambiguation)
 Nix (disambiguation)